Carlos Augusto Ribeiro Canário (1918–1990) was a Portuguese footballer, played midfielder for Estrela Portalegre, Sporting and the Portugal national team. He was born in Portalegre.

External links 
 
 

1918 births
1990 deaths
Sporting CP footballers
Portugal international footballers
Portuguese footballers
Primeira Liga players
People from Portalegre, Portugal
Association football midfielders
Sportspeople from Portalegre District